Qoph is a progressive rock band from Stockholm, Sweden, present since 1994.

Biography
Qoph started in the 1990s as one of the pioneers of the stoner rock scene in Sweden. Originally formed as an experimental rock act Robin Kvist joined the band adding Swedish lyrics on what was later to become Qoph's debut album Kalejdoskopiska Aktiviteter (Kaleidoscopic Activities), released in 1998. 
The album cover was painted by Swiss/Swedish surrealist artist Hans Arnold, who also did the cover for the 1976's ABBA album, Greatest Hits.

Drummer Federico de Costa, guitarist Filip Norman and bassist Patrik Persson were core members of several line ups before 1998. Many of the earlier songs were instrumental.
In 1996 Jimmy Wahlsteen replaced original guitarist Fredrik Rönnqvist, who went on founding The Moon. Some early Qoph songs later appeared on The Moon’s album In Phase (2005 Nasoni Records).

After the release of the EP Än lyser månen in 2000, Qoph started writing their songs in English.
Jimmy Wahlsteen left the band in 2001.

Second album Pyrola (2004), released in Sweden, Germany and Japan, featuring several guest appearances, including Mats Öberg (Mats/Morgan Band), Joakim Svalberg (Opeth, Yngwie Malmsteen), Nicklas Barker (Anekdoten) and Dennis Berg (Abramis Brama).

Percussionist Per Wikström joined the band as a live member performing at several progressive rock festivals in Europe and USA, among them Burg Herzberg festival in Germany and Progday, USA.
The band's third album Freaks, with new member Rustan Geschwind on vocals, was released by Transubstans Records and Nasoni Records in 2012.

Members
Federico de Costa - drums
Rustan Geschwind - vocals
Filip Norman - guitars
Patrik Persson - bass

Discography

Albums
Kalejdoskopiska Aktiviteter CD/LP (1998 Record Heaven)
Pyrola CD/LP (2004 Kaleidophone/Disk Union/Nasoni Records)
Freaks CD/LP (2012 Transubstans Records/Nasoni Records)
Glancing Madly Backwards - Rare & Unreleased 1994-2004 CD (2014 Transubstans Records)

Singles/EPs
Aldrig Tillbaks 7' single (1998 Record Heaven)
Än lyser månen EP (2000 Record Heaven)

Compilation appearances
"Dansar Galet Bakåt" on Thousand Days of Yesterdays - A Tribute to Captain Beyond CD (1999 Record Heaven)
"Rastlös" & "Restless" on Sweet F.A. CD (2002 Scana)
"Resh" on An introduction to Nasoni Records Berlin CD (2005 Nasoni Records)

Related
 The Moon - In Phase LP (2005 Nasoni Records)

References

External links
 Qoph MySpace
 Qoph Facebook
 Transubstans Records
 Nasoni Records
 Discogs

Swedish stoner rock musical groups
Swedish progressive rock groups
Swedish psychedelic rock music groups
Musical groups established in 1996